The Chats are an Australian punk rock band that formed in 2016 in the Sunshine Coast, Queensland. They describe their sound as "shed rock". The current band lineup is composed of guitarist Josh Hardy, drummer Matt Boggis, and bassist and vocalist Eamon Sandwith. Known for their songs about Australian culture, they initially went viral for their song "Smoko" and its accompanying music video in 2017. To date they have released two EPs, The Chats (2016) and Get This in Ya!! (2017), and two studio albums High Risk Behaviour (2020) and Get Fucked (2022).

History

2016: Early years and debut EP
Josh Price, Matt Boggis and Eamon Sandwith met in music class at St. Teresa's Catholic College in Noosaville, Queensland. When they were 17, in September 2016, they formed the Chats, with Price on guitar, Boggis on drums, and Sandwith on bass and vocals. Former member Tremayne McCarthy also played bass and guitar in the original lineup. The band takes its name from the phrase "that's chat" - (Australian slang to describe something gross/disgusting/bad).

Their debut self-titled EP, recorded at another local high school, was released on 7 November 2016. Triple J described the EP as "seven joyous sky-punching tracks that combined 60s garage punk and 70s new wave punk".

2017: Get This in Ya!!

Their second EP, Get This in Ya!! was released on 31 July 2017, "another thrilling seven-song slice of economic, stripped-down, early Buzzcocks-styles punk tension". It was tracked/recorded at Eleven PM Studios in Nambour, Queensland, Australia, by Finn Wegener and Michael Currie on 24 June 2017. Former member, Tremayne McCarthy, actually played bass on the "Smoko" track and spoke the line "Is it Smoko?". Michael Currie was the producer and decided that the best way to record the band was all in the same room together live.  Only very minimal overdubbing was done. It was then mixed and mastered by Michael Currie at his Polished Turd Studios in Brisbane, Australia. The music video for the track "Smoko", filmed with no budget at a building site, was directed by Matisse Langbein, who also did the cover art for the EP, and was released on the 3rd of October, quickly becoming a viral hit and drawing attention from popular rock musicians Dave Grohl, Josh Homme, Iggy Pop, Alex Turner. Triple J argued that the song "was an instant classic of a youth anthem on a par with 'You Really Got Me', 'My Generation' or 'Teenage Kicks'".

2018–2020: Universal signing and High Risk Behaviour
On 3 July 2018, the Chats released the single "Do What I Want", announced to be included in their forthcoming studio album.

The band signed a global deal with Universal Music Publishing Australia on 19 March 2019, and founded their own label, Bargain Bin Records. Their distribution is handled by Cooking Vinyl Australia. On 21 March, the Chats released "Pub Feed" alongside an accompanying music video. Throughout July, the band toured the United States. On 26 July, they released the single "Identity Theft" alongside an accompanying music video, which contains references to the video game Guitar Hero. The band performed at the UK Reading and Leeds Festivals in August. In October, the Chats commenced an Australian national tour. The band performed a headlining tour in the UK during December 2019. When asked about the then-untitled High Risk Behaviour during an interview at the Reading Festival, Sandwith revealed that the songs were already recorded: "We're gonna call it done...we're not perfectionists or anything.".

In late-December, Sandwith posted a song criticizing Prime Minister Scott Morrison for his perceived apathy and carelessness towards the 2019-20 bushfire crisis to Instagram, titled "I Hope Scott's House Burns Down"; according to Pedestrian.tv, the song is being used to aid fundraising efforts for numerous volunteer firefighter groups. The band released the single "The Clap" on 17 January 2020 and revealed the name of their debut studio album, High Risk Behaviour, as well as a release date of 27 March. On 6 March, weeks before its release, the band released the single "Dine & Dash" and its accompanying music video.

2020–present: Price's departure and Get Fucked
On 8 November, the band released the single, "AC/DC CD", a tribute to the Australian band AC/DC. Guitarist Josh Price was not featured in the song’s music video, but Josh Hardy of Australian band the Unknowns was. In December, the band officially confirmed Price's departure and announced Hardy as his replacement.

On 10 September 2021, the band released a cover of Metallica's "Holier Than Thou" for the charity tribute album The Metallica Blacklist. This was followed in December by another cover version, The Wiggles' "Can You Point Your Fingers (And Do the Twist?)", as part of the Wiggles tribute album ReWiggled. The Wiggles simultaneously shared a cover of The Chats' "Pub Feed", which would appear on the album's second disc.

In March 2022, the band shared the single "Struck by Lightning". In May, the band announced their second studio album Get Fucked, released on 19 August 2022. The announcement came with the release of the album's second single, "6L GTR".

Musical style and influences
The band coined the term "shed rock" to describe their sound, and their self-contained approach has been likened to that of King Gizzard & the Lizard Wizard. They cited Australian bands Cosmic Psychos, Dune Rats and Eddy Current Suppression Ring as major influences.

Band members
Current members
 Eamon Sandwith – lead vocals, bass guitar (2016–present)
 Matt Boggis – drums, backing vocals (2016–present)
 Josh Hardy - guitar, backing vocals  (2020–present)

Past members
 Tremayne McCarthy – bass, guitar, backing vocals (2016–2017) 
Josh "Pricey" Price – guitar, backing and lead vocals (2016–2020)

Timeline

Discography

 High Risk Behaviour (2020)
 Get Fucked (2022)

Awards and nominations

AIR Awards
The Australian Independent Record Awards (commonly known informally as AIR Awards) is an annual awards night to recognise, promote and celebrate the success of Australia's Independent Music sector.

! 
|-
|2021
|High Risk Behaviour
|Best Independent Punk Album or EP
|
|
|-

ARIA Music Awards
The ARIA Music Awards are a set of annual ceremonies presented by Australian Recording Industry Association (ARIA), which recognise excellence, innovation, and achievement across all genres of the music of Australia. They commenced in 1987. 

! 
|-
| rowspan="2" |2020
|High Risk Behaviour
| ARIA Award for Best Hard Rock or Heavy Metal Album
| 
| rowspan="2" |
|-
| "The Clap"
| ARIA Award for Best Video
|
|-
| 2022
| Get Fucked
| Best Hard Rock or Heavy Metal Album
| 
| 
|-

J Awards
The J Awards are an annual series of Australian music awards that were established by the Australian Broadcasting Corporation's youth-focused radio station Triple J. They commenced in 2005.

! 
|-
| rowspan="2" | J Awards of 2019
| "Identity Theft"
| Australian Video of the Year
| 
| rowspan="2" | 
|-
| The Chats
| Unearthed Artist of the Year
| 
|-

National Live Music Awards
The National Live Music Awards (NLMAs) are a broad recognition of Australia's diverse live industry, celebrating the success of the Australian live scene. The awards commenced in 2016.

! 
|-
|2019
|The Chats
|Best New Act
|
|
|-

Rolling Stone Australia Awards
The Rolling Stone Australia Awards are awarded annually in January or February by the Australian edition of Rolling Stone magazine for outstanding contributions to popular culture in the previous year.

! 
|-
| 2021
| The Chats
| Rolling Stone Reader's Award
| 
| 
|-

References

External links
 
 

2016 establishments in Australia
ARIA Award winners
Australian musical trios
Australian punk rock groups
Australian rock music groups
Musical groups established in 2016
Queensland musical groups